The Sistema de Tren Eléctrico Urbano (Spanish for Urban Electric Train System), is an urban rail transit system serving the Guadalajara metropolitan area, in the municipalities of Guadalajara, Zapopan and Tlaquepaque, in the state of Jalisco, Mexico. It is owned by the state of Jalisco, and is operated by the state authority SITEUR.  Opened in 1989, the system consists of three lines: Line 1, running from north to south with 20 stations; Line 2, running from the city center to the east with 10 stations; and Line 3, running from the north-west to south-east with 18 stations. A fourth line is under construction, which will run from the city center to the south of the metropolitan area.

History 
The history of urban trains in Guadalajara dates back to the 19th century, with the first trams pulled by mules, serving a route between the Guadalajara Cathedral and the Templo de la Merced.

In 1974, several houses and streets in the city centre were demolished to make way for a new wide roadway, named Avenida Federalismo; the construction project included a new public-transport tunnel beneath the roadway. Avenida Federalismo (also known as Calzada del Federalismo) replaced what had been C. Moro (but with a much wider right-of-way) and is one of Guadalajara's major thoroughfares. The  tunnel underneath the avenue was designed for future use by a rail system, but due to a lack of funding at the time, it was served initially by a new trolleybus system, which opened on December 15, 1976. Several years later, work began to convert the trolleybus tunnel and stations for use by a light rail line.  The tunnel closed for trolleybuses in early 1988, and the first light rail line, Line 1, opened on September 1, 1989. Trolleybus service has remained in operation on other routes.

A few years later, Line 2 was constructed, generally running east from the city center; it opened on July 1, 1994. Because of the continuing heavy traffic congestion on the city's streets and the large numbers of users of the rail system, there are plans to extend Line 2 to the west.

Line 1 runs underground in the city center, but runs "at grade" north and south of the city center, and its surface sections include several level crossings, protected by crossing gates.  The station platforms accommodate trains composed of up to 3 cars.  Line 2 is entirely underground except for a non-passenger section at its east end, connecting the last station to the maintenance facility.  Its stations are long enough to accommodate trains of up to four cars.

Siemens supplied the system engineering, signaling and telecommunication, power supply, and some components of the vehicles.

Construction of Line 3 began at the end of 2014. It crosses the full length of the city running northwest to southeast, from Zapopan in the northwest to Tlaquepaque and Tonalá, in the southeast, through the city center. In addition to the rolling stock, Alstom provided the communication, signalling, and traffic control systems for Line 3, which began operation on September 12, 2020.

Partial operation began with three-car trains in March 2019, and the platform extension project is expected to be complete by May 2019; other upgrades to train signaling and control are expected to be complete by July 2020. The TEG-90 fleet was updated with new motors and power converters.

Construction of Line 4 began on May 22, 2022, and the line is estimated to be completed by 2024.

Lines

Line 1 

Line 1 runs from north (North Beltway) to south (South Beltway). Line 1 stations are:

 Auditorio
 Periférico Norte (North Beltway)
 Dermatológico
 Atemajac
 División del Norte
 Ávila Camacho (transfer with Line 3)
 Mezquitán
 Refugio
  (transfer with Line 2)
 Mexicaltzingo
 Washington
 Santa Filomena
 Unidad Deportiva
 Urdaneta
 18 de Marzo
 Isla Raza
 Patria
 España
 Santuario Mártires de Cristo Rey
 Periférico Sur (South Beltway)

Line 2 

Its stations are:

  (transfer with Line 1)
 Plaza Universidad (transfer with Line 3)
 San Juan de Dios (transfer with Mi Macro Calzada)
 Belisario Domínguez
 Oblatos
 Cristóbal de Oñate
 San Andrés
 San Jacinto
 La Aurora
 Tetlán

Line 3 

Line 3 runs from Zapopan in the northwest to Tlaquepaque and Tonalá in the southeast.

 Arcos de Zapopan
 Periférico Belenes
 Mercado del Mar
 Zapopan Centro
 Plaza Patria
 Circunvalación Country
 Ávila Camacho  (Connection with Line 1)
 La Normal
 Santuario
 Guadalajara Centro  (Connection with Line 2)
 Independencia
 Plaza de la Bandera
 CUCEI
 Revolución
 Río Nilo
 Tlaquepaque Centro
 Lázaro Cárdenas
 Central de Autobuses

Line 4 

Line 4 is planned to run from Guadalajara to the municipality of Tlajomulco. The planned stations are:

 Las Juntas
 Periférico Sur
 Adolf Horn
 Concepción del Valle
 San Sebastián
 La Fortuna
 Centro Universitario
 Tlajomulco Centro

Fleet 
The fleet consists of 78 articulated light rail vehicles, each bi-directional ("double-ended") and powered from overhead lines. Three of the models are the same general type – only the Barcelona Metro 9000 Series units, which operate on the Line 3, are different – three models were built in Mexico, and one model was built in Spain.

The first 16 TLG-88 (Tren Ligero de Guadalajara, 1988) cars were built by Concarril in Ciudad Sahagún, using propulsion equipment from Melmex (Mitsubishi Electric of Mexico). Another 32 TEG-90 (Tren Eléctrico de Guadalajara, 1990) cars were ordered in 1990 and were manufactured by Bombardier, which acquired Concarril in 1992; the TEG-90 cars were built in the same factory as the earlier batch of TLG-88 cars. The TEG-90 are cosmetically similar to the TLG-88 but use propulsion equipment from Siemens. Both the TLG-88 and TEG-90 are derived from the Stadtbahnwagen B design.

SITEUR ordered 18 Barcelona Metro 9000 Series from Alstom for Line 3 in 2014.

In 2015 SITEUR ordered 12 TEG-15 (Tren Eléctrico de Guadalajara, 2015) cars, also from Bombardier, for Line 1. The TEG-15 is based on the TE-12 design for Servicio de Transportes Eléctricos del Distrito Federal in Mexico City.

Gallery

See also 
 Sistema Integral del Tren Ligero
 Guadalajara Mi Macro
 Light rail in North America
 List of Latin American rail transit systems by ridership
 List of North American light rail systems by ridership
 Trolleybuses in Guadalajara

References

External links 

 SITEUR 
 Guadalajara at UrbanRail.net
 Mapa del sistema en Google Earth 

Guadalajara light rail system
1989 establishments in Mexico
750 V DC railway electrification
Light rail in Mexico
Railway lines opened in 1989
Rapid transit in Mexico
Light rail
Underground rapid transit in Mexico